The 1984 Ottawa Rough Riders finished the season in fourth place in the East Division with a 4–12 record. As such, the Rough Riders missed the playoffs for the first time since 1970.

Offseason

CFL draft

Preseason

Regular season

Standings

Schedule

Awards and honours

CFL awards
CFLPA's Most Outstanding Community Service Award – Bruce Walker (OT)

CFL All-Stars
None

References

Ottawa Rough Riders seasons
1984 Canadian Football League season by team